Candy from a Stranger is Soul Asylum's eighth studio album. It was released on May 12, 1998 (see 1998 in music). It follows 1995's Let Your Dim Light Shine.

The band had originally planned to release an album entitled Creatures of Habit produced by Matt Hyde. Columbia Records did not approve of the recordings and shelved the album a few weeks before it was supposed to be released. The band re-entered the studio, this time with British producer Chris Kimsey, and emerged with Candy from a Stranger. Most of the songs featured were previously recorded during the Creatures of Habit sessions. Drummer Sterling Campbell left the band after the album was completed.

"I Will Still Be Laughing" achieved fame after it was featured in the closing credits of the 1998 comedy BASEketball.

Track listing
All songs written by Dave Pirner except as noted.

"Creatures of Habit" – 3:23
"I Will Still Be Laughing" – 3:46
"Close" – 4:33
"See You Later" – 4:46
"No Time for Waiting" – 3:16
"Blood into Wine" (Dan Murphy, Elizabeth Herman) – 4:03
"Lies of Hate" (Dave Pirner, Sterling Campbell) – 4:39
"Draggin' the Lake" – 3:38
"New York Blackout" – 4:05
"The Game" – 4:27
"Cradle Chain" – 4:45
"Losin' It" (bonus track on the Japanese edition)

Singles

"I Will Still Be Laughing"
"Close"

Charts
Album - Billboard (United States)

Singles - Billboard (United States)

Band members
 Dave Pirner – lead vocals, rhythm guitar
 Dan Murphy – lead guitar, backing vocals
 Karl Mueller – bass
 Sterling Campbell – drums

References

Soul Asylum albums
1998 albums
Columbia Records albums
Albums produced by Chris Kimsey